myGwork is a global recruitment and networking hub for LGBT professionals, graduates, allies, and organisations to promote diversity and inclusion in the workplace and beyond. It was created by twin brothers Adrien and Pierre Gaubert.
myGwork is a Limited Company registered in the United Kingdom.

History
The company was founded when Adrien and Pierre's mother, Francoise, was worried about the prejudice they could face in their professional life for being gay. They built myGwork to address the issue of discrimination towards LGBT people in the workplace and ensure every professional equal chances to succeed.

Both brothers faced homophobia or discrimination because they were gay during their previous employment.

In 2015, myGwork made it to the top 5 of startups with LGBT pride by the magazine Geektime along with Lyft, Airbnb, Square and Snapchat.

Model 
myGwork has been praised as reinventing "the way LGBT+ professionals search, find, and securejobs in inclusive organisations." Through utilising a combination of a news blog, events hosting, and a social networking function, the company has built a network that continues to thrive.

WorkPride 
In June 2020, as a result of the coronavirus pandemic cancelling Pride parades across the globe, myGwork announced its first global conference, "WorkPride", a 5-day conference which would launch in the place of the cancelled events.

According to Pierre Gaubert, the conference was aimed at bringing together and celebrating LGBTQ+ people, during what is a difficult time for many, saying: "The ongoing pandemic has serious implications for the mental health of LGBTQ+ people. With most pride events being postponed or cancelled around the world we want to make sure the LGBTQ+ business community is visible and celebrated. This is a great opportunity for organisations committed to LGBTQ+ inclusion and their employees to come together to continue the conversation about what true equality in the workplace looks like – even from home."

Awards
 Attitude Magazine and Virgin Holiday Award of Best LGBT Entrepreneur of the Year.

See also 
 Homosocialization

References

British social networking websites
Professional networks
LGBT-related websites
Employment websites in the United Kingdom
Business services companies established in 2013
Internet properties established in 2013
Freelance marketplace websites